The Narikkuṟava are an indigenous group from the Indian state of Tamil Nadu.

The main occupation of the people who originally belong to the indigenous tribes is hunting. But as they were prohibited entry into the forests to pursue this livelihood, they were forced to take up other alternatives such as selling beaded ornaments to survive. Hence, they migrate from place to place to find a market for their beads. Children accompany the adults wherever they go, which means they never get to attend school.

During British rule in India they were placed under the Criminal Tribes Act of 1871, and hence stigmatized for a long time, including after Independence. They were denotified in 1952, though the stigma continues.

Etymology

Their original name is Wagrivala or Kuruvikkaran or Nakkale or Akkibikki but wrongly named Narikurava in the ruling period of Tamil Nadu Chief Minister M. G. Ramachandran. Since Kuravas are the Tamils belonging to Kurinji Thinai[hills] mentioned in Sangam literature but this Narikkarar are Marathis. They hunt with guns but the original Tamil Kuravas occupation is hunting with bow and arrow collecting honey making bamboo baskets. This is the difference between Tamil Kuravas and Marathi Akkibikkis.

Origins 

As per a theory propounded by Werth in 1966 and Fraser, authorities on the "Gypsies" of Europe, believes that the Domar are the ancestors of the Romani people and therefore, the Narikuravas are related to the Romani. while Edgar Thurston feels that they are related to the Khonds of Orissa.

Language 

The Narikuravas speak the unclassified Indo-Aryan language called Vaagri Booli.

Due to this reason, they are also known as Vagris or Vagrivalas. Almost all Narikuravas are well-versed in Tamil. However, most of the Narikurava liturgical hymns and folk songs are in Vagriboli.

Sub-divisions 

Although all vagirivala or kuruvikarar come under one roof based on their common clan name  nari-kuravars they were broadly sub-divided into two sub-divisions: the  buffalo-sacrificers and Nandevala or goat-sacrificers. But they are commonly classified based on the region they originate from. The Seliyos have only one sub-sect—the Vithiyo.

Customs and practices 

Each Narikurava clan has a bundle of clothes called sami-mootai meaning "God's bundle". It is filled with blood of animals sacrificed by the Narikuravas and clothes dipped in them. The sami-mootai of one clan must not be touched by members of another clan. On the death of the head of the family, his eldest son inherits the sami-mootai. The prestige a clan-leader holds depends on the antiquity of his sami-mootai.

Silambam 

Silambam is a stick fighting style that supposedly originated from the Kurinji hills some 5000 years ago, where the native kuravar used bamboo staves called Silambamboo to defend themselves against wild animals.

Issues 

The major issues which confront Narikuravas are poverty, illiteracy, diseases and discrimination.

There has been discrimination of Narikuravas since ancient times. Due to their consumption of the Golden Jackal, which is forbidden by settled Hindu communities and other habits, they are considered untouchable and are excluded from streets inhabited by upper castes. This has led to protests and resentment from the community. However, the Narikuravas are yet to be recognized as a scheduled tribe.

High crime rates and unemployment are other problems which afflict the Narikurava community. The proscription of fox-hunting as well as killing endangered species of birds and wildlife have depleted the Narikuravas of their traditional sources of livelihood. As a result, unemployed Narikurava youth are taking to crime and illegal activities. There have also been instances when Narikurava have been arrested for the possession of unregistered firearms as country rifles which are banned according to the Indian laws.

On 1996, a social-welfare organization named Narikurava Seva Sangam was formed in order to educate Narikurava children and facilitate them to lead a settled life. Other social-welfare organizations, too, have poured in their efforts to improve the lives of the Narikuravas. In May 2008, the creation of a Welfare Board for the Narikuravas headed by the Backward Classes Minister was authorized by the State Government. Steady progress is being made in educating Narikuravas and assimilating them into society. The demand to remove them from the Backward Class list and include them into Scheduled Tribes was accepted by the government of Tamil Nadu.

See also 
 Domba
 Dom people
 Origins of the Romani people

Notes

External links

References

Further reading

External links 
 

Dom in India
Indian castes
Tamil society
Ethnic groups in India
Social groups of Tamil Nadu
Denotified tribes of India
Romani in India